The 27th César Awards ceremony, presented by the Académie des Arts et Techniques du Cinéma, honoured the best films of 2001 in France and took place on 2 March 2002 at the Théâtre du Châtelet in Paris. The ceremony was chaired by Nathalie Baye and hosted by Édouard Baer. Amélie won the award for Best Film.

Winners and nominees

Films with multiple nominations and awards 

The following films received multiple nominations:

The following films received multiple awards:

See also
 74th Academy Awards
 55th British Academy Film Awards
 14th European Film Awards
 7th Lumières Awards

External links
 Official website
 
 27th César Awards at AlloCiné

2002
2002 film awards
2002 in French cinema
March 2002 events in France